Kuchaluy, also known as Kachu, may refer to:
 Kuchaluy-e Olya
 Kuchaluy-e Sofla